Lipid phosphate phosphohydrolase 1 also known as  phosphatidic acid phosphatase 2a is an enzyme that in humans is encoded by the PPAP2A gene.

Function 

Lipid phosphate phosphohydrolase 1 is a member of the phosphatidic acid phosphatase (PAP) family. PAPs convert phosphatidic acid to diacylglycerol, and function in de novo synthesis of glycerolipids as well as in receptor-activated signal transduction mediated by phospholipase D. This protein is an integral membrane glycoprotein, and has been shown to be a surface enzyme that plays an active role in the hydrolysis and uptake of lipids from extracellular space. The expression of this gene is found to be regulated by androgen in a prostatic adenocarcinoma cell line. At least two alternatively spliced transcript variants encoding distinct isoforms have been described.

References

Further reading